Bable Terror is a 1982 video game published by Funsoft.

Gameplay

Bable Terror is a game in which the player is a knight returning from the crusades searching for 10 crosses in a maze.

Reception
Dick McGrath reviewed the game for Computer Gaming World, and stated that "I gave Babel Terror a 6 out of 10."

References

External links
Review in 80 Micro
80-U.S. article about Funsoft

1982 video games